Colonel Sir Edwin James Hayward, CBE, VD (24 December 1868 – 14 November 1929) was a British soldier who was acting Commander of the Ceylon Defence Force. He was appointed on 6 March 1914.

He was appointed a Commander of the Order of the British Empire (CBE) in 1923 and knighted in 1927.

References

1868 births
1929 deaths
Commanders of the Ceylon Defence Force
Knights Bachelor
Commanders of the Order of the British Empire
People from British Ceylon
Sri Lankan people of English descent
Members of the Legislative Council of Ceylon
Military personnel from Surrey